Nuevo Rico Nuevo Pobre is a Colombian telenovela produced and broadcast by Caracol TV starring Martín Karpan, John Alex Toro (well known by his participation in Maria Full of Grace), Maria Cecilia Botero, Carolina Acevedo, Hugo Gómez, former Miss Colombia Andrea Nocetti and Andrés Toro (from Sin Tetas No Hay Paraíso).

The show started on July 78 2007 on Caracol TV and it is also broadcast on Ecuador's Teleamazonas in primetime. Caracol TV has sold the rights of the show to Telemundo and Fox. It is, as of May 2008, one of the highest rated TV shows in Colombia.

Plot

The Telenovela follows Andrés Ferreira, who was born from a poor woman and went with a rich woman, and Brayan Galindo, who was born to a rich woman and went with a poor woman. 
After 30 years, Andrés went to the pensión where Brayan lived and met his true family; Brayan went to live with his real mother and his new fiancé, Fernanda Sanmiguel (who only wants him for his money, and is the lover of Andrés's cousin, Mateo). Brayan is now the owner of the Ferreira enterprise Mundo Express, and it is later revealed that Mateo, Brayan's cousin, is trying to steal his money as well as MundoExpress.

Cultural aspects

The name of Brayan Galindo reflects an irregular adaptation of Brian to   Spanish. 

The social consequences of massive dismissals of 200 employees as a result of restructuring inserts a dramatic effect into the plot, and creates a cold image of the business world and Andrés Ferreira.

Cast

 Martín Karpan - Andres Galindo
 John Alex Toro - Bryan Ferreira
 Carolina Acevedo - Rosemary Peláez
 Andrea Nocetti - Fernanda Sanmiguel
 Andrés Toro - Mateo Lopez Ferreira
 Maria Cecilia Botero - Antonia Vda. de Ferreira
 Hugo Gómez - Leonidas Galindo
 Diana Neira - Ingrid Peláez
  Rosemary Bohórquez - Maritza Buenahora
 Isabel Cristina Estrada - lizeth
 Liliana Escobar - Esperanza Romero de Galindo
 Andrés Parra - Orlando Araújo
 Mauricio Vélez - Fidel Peláez
 Hermes Camelo - Edmundo Gonzaga †
 Juan Carlos Pérez Almanza - Malaleche
 Jimmy Vásquez - Miller Anselmo
 Lorena Tobar - Florens
 Carlos Serrato - Dr. Trujillo
 Edna Márquez - Roberta
 Nataly Umaña - Llona
 Saín Castro. - Anselmo Afanador
 Jorge Sánchez Salsa - Héctor
  Gerardo Calero - Emilio
 Herbert King. - Hugo
 John Mario Rivera - Julio Landazuri
 Fernando Arango - "Peluche"
 Harold Córdoba - "El Mono"
 Natalie Ackermann - Astrid Jeunger alias
 Maribel Abello -  Deyanira Puyana De Sanmiguel
 Vicki Rueda - Diana Inés Martínez
 Astrid Junguito - Genoveva Carranza
 Jarold Fonseca - Pachón
 Pacho Rueda - Policía Casper

International remakes

– Ela sti thesi mou
Premiered on Alpha TV on 3 October 2016 and it's currently on air, counting 5 seasons.

– Igra Sudbine
Premiered on Prva Srpska Televizija on 20 January 2020 and it's currently on air, counting 500+ episodes and 3 seasons.

References

External links
 Caracol TV official site (in Spanish)

2007 telenovelas
2007 Colombian television series debuts
2008 Colombian television series endings
Colombian telenovelas
Caracol Televisión telenovelas
Spanish-language telenovelas
Television shows set in Bogotá